Nicole Nketo Bomele (born 29 June 1967) is a Belgian politician who serves as a member of the Parliament of the Brussels-Capital Region.

Biography 
Nicole Nketo Bomele was born in Kinshasa, Congo on 29 June 1967. At age nine, Bomele and her family moved to Belgium. In 1991, Bomele graduated from Universite catholique de Louvain with a degree in public and international relations. After university, she worked as a diplomat at the Congolese Embassy in Madrid. She returned to Congo several years later and became a television journalist in Kinshasa. In 1998, Bomele returned to international relations, serving in the Congolese Ministry of Foreign Affairs and later as a diplomat for the Congolese Embassy in Brazzaville.

In 2003, Bomele returned to Belgium, where she worked for a variety of associations and organizations. In 2009, Bomele founded Anderlecht en couleurs, a multiracial youth organization.

Since 2006, Bomele has served as a Community Councilor in Anderlecht. Originally elected as a member of the cdH, she changed parties to the Parti socialiste, and later ran as a member of DéFI in the 2018 Belgian local elections. In the 2019 Belgian regional elections, Bomele was elected as a member of the Brussels-Capital Region Parliament when Mayor of Schaerbeek Bernard Clerfayt decided not to take his seat.

References 

Socialist Party (Belgium) politicians
DéFI politicians
Members of the Parliament of the Brussels-Capital Region
1967 births
Living people
People from Kinshasa
People from Anderlecht
21st-century Belgian women politicians
21st-century Belgian politicians